Sweet William is the eighteenth short story collection in the Just William series by Richmal Crompton. The book contains 10 short stories and was first published in 1936. It is illustrated by Thomas Henry.

The Stories are:

William and the Wonderful Present Robert is terrified that the necklace he's bought for his girlfriend's birthday present looks "too common".
William and the Perfect Child William acquires a horse.
William Helps the Cause Charmed by a beautiful lady who visits his school, William supports her "good cause" by faking his own kidnapping.
William and the Bugle William "borrows" a bugle from his brother Robert, only to have it confiscated by his history teacher. Anticipating his brothers wrath, William forms a plan to get it back.
William and the Policeman's Helmet William is thrilled to be invited to a party, the host of which possesses a "real policeman's helmet". He borrows it and foils a burglary. 
William the Reformer Inspired by the anti-slavery reforms of Pitt and Wilberforce, William decides its time for some new reforms; namely Free Sweet Shops and Christmas Every Week.
St. Mars' Day The Outlaws are sick of celebrating St. Valentine's Day each year and decide it is time for a change.
Uncle Charlie and the Outlaws Hubert's childish uncle makes the Outlaws' lives miserable, but William has a plan to get even...  
Pensions for Boys William reckons that the young deserve pensions as well as the old.
A Spot of Heroism A chance event on the way to the seaside makes William a hero. Unfortunately he doesn't stay one for long...

In particular the story 'Pensions for Boys' is notable for suggesting the location of the fictional village in which the stories are set (about 50 miles from London).

1936 short story collections
Short story collections by Richmal Crompton
Children's short story collections
Just William
1936 children's books
George Newnes Ltd books